Malignant is a 2013 American horror film written and directed by Brian Avenet-Bradley.  It stars Gary Cairns and Brad Dourif as a patient who undergoes involuntary treatment to cure his alcoholism and the mad doctor who performs it, respectively.

Synopsis

After his wife dies, Alex becomes a self-destructive alcoholic.  A mysterious doctor shows Alex the consequences of his actions, and the involuntary treatment leaves Alex with incisions.  The doctor explains that whenever Alex drinks to excess, an implant will force him to violently murder people.

Cast 
 Gary Cairns as Alex
 Brad Dourif as The Man
 Nick Nicotera as Chad
 Sienna Farall as Emily
 Steve Wastell as Charlie
 Jennifer Blanc as Gail

Production 
Dourif said that he was approached by the filmmakers and accepted the role because he found the character interesting.  Dourif said that the character feigns sympathy, which makes him easier to portray as somewhat sympathetic.

Release 
Malignant premiered at Shriekfest in Los Angeles on October 4, 2013.  It was released to video on demand in May 2014.  The DVD was released February 17, 2015.

Reception 
Pat Torfe of Bloody Disgusting rated it 2.5/5 stars and wrote, "Diehard fans of Dourif may get some enjoyment out of seeing him strut his stuff, but it's ultimately not enough for this film to be entertaining."  Scott Hallam of Dread Central rated it 2.5/5 stars and wrote, "The casting of Brad Dourif as a maniacal scientist was a brilliant move that took a movie that might have been a throwaway and elevated it to at least a satisfactory level."  Ross Peterson of HorrorNews.Net wrote that Dourif's character is far more interesting and is not given enough screen time in comparison to the lead.  Mark L. Miller of Ain't It Cool News wrote, "Brian Avenet-Bradley has constructed a solid thriller here with a strong mystery, characters you can't help but feel for, and a diabolical and bent villain in Dourif."

References

External links 
 
 

2013 films
2013 horror films
American horror thriller films
American independent films
Films about alcoholism
2010s English-language films
2010s American films